The Silk Stocking District is a historic district in the city of Talladega, Alabama, USA. It was listed on the National Register of Historic Places on December 13, 1979. Architectural styles include Queen Anne, Classical Revival, Colonial Revival, American Craftsman, and other late Victorian types.

References

Historic districts in Talladega County, Alabama
National Register of Historic Places in Talladega County, Alabama
American Craftsman architecture in Alabama
Beaux-Arts architecture in Alabama
Neoclassical architecture in Alabama
Colonial Revival architecture in Alabama
Queen Anne architecture in Alabama
Victorian architecture in Alabama
Historic districts on the National Register of Historic Places in Alabama